Lomas Brown Jr. (born March 30, 1963) is an American former college and professional football player who was an offensive tackle in the National Football League (NFL) for 18 seasons in the 1980s, 1990s and early 2000s.  Brown played college football for the University of Florida, and received consensus All-American honors.  A first-round pick in the 1985 NFL Draft, he played professionally for the Detroit Lions and four other NFL teams.  He is currently a color analyst for Lions radio broadcasts on WXYT 97.1 The Ticket, as well as a commentator and analyst for ESPN and other television and radio networks.

Early life 

Brown was born in Miami, Florida.  He attended Miami Springs High School in Miami Springs, Florida, where he was a stand-out offensive lineman for the Miami Springs Golden Hawks high school football team.  In 2007, the Florida High School Athletic Association (FHSAA) recognized Brown as one of the 33 all-time greatest Florida high school football players of the last 100 years by naming him to its "All-Century Team."

College career 

Brown accepted an athletic scholarship to attend the University of Florida in Gainesville, Florida, where he played for coach Charley Pell and coach Galen Hall's Florida Gators football teams from 1981 to 1984.  He started 34 games in his college career at Florida, all at tackle.  Brown was a team captain, a first-team All-Southeastern Conference (SEC) selection and a consensus first-team All-American, and the winner of the Jacobs Blocking Trophy recognizing the best blocker in the SEC during his senior year in 1984.  He anchored the Gators' outstanding offensive line, memorably dubbed "The Great Wall of Florida," and which included Brown, Phil Bromley, Billy Hinson, Crawford Ker and Jeff Zimmerman in 1984.  Behind the blocking of Brown and his Great Wall teammates, the Gators' quarterback Kerwin Bell, fullback John L. Williams and halfback Neal Anderson led the Gators to a 9–1–1 overall win–loss record and won their first SEC championship with a conference record of 5–0–1.  (The title was later vacated by the SEC university presidents because of NCAA rules violations committed by Charley Pell and the Gators coaching staff between 1979 and 1983.)  Brown was inducted into the University of Florida Athletic Hall of Fame as a "Gator Great" in 1995.  As part of its 2006 article series about the top 100 players of the first 100 years of Florida football, The Gainesville Sun recognized him as the No. 8 all-time Gator player.

While Brown was a student at Florida, he was initiated as a member of Phi Beta Sigma Fraternity (Zeta Kappa Chapter).  He later returned to the university during the NFL off-season to complete his bachelor's degree in health and human performance in 1996.

Professional career 

The Detroit Lions selected Brown in the first round (sixth pick overall) in the 1985 NFL Draft, and he played for the Lions for 11 seasons (–).  In his long professional career, he also played for the Arizona Cardinals (–), the Cleveland Browns, the New York Giants (–), and the Tampa Bay Buccaneers, with whom he won a Super Bowl before retiring after 18 seasons in the NFL.  Brown was a remarkably consistent starter in his unusually long-lived career, playing in 263 games and starting 251 of them, and was named to the NFC Pro Bowl team seven straight seasons from 1990 to 1996.

Brown is probably remembered most from his years in Detroit, where he gained the reputation as one of the league's premier offensive tackles.  He was a pivotal piece on the offensive line that blocked for perhaps the greatest running back of all-time (Barry Sanders).  Brown was one of the most durable offensive linemen in the Detroit Lions' history, starting all but one of the 164 games that he played for the Lions.

He blocked for Sanders for seven seasons (–), and Sanders accumulated 10,172 yards (an average of 4.9 yards per carry) and 73 rushing touchdowns during that time.

In 1991, the Lions set a franchise high with 12 regular season wins and earned a berth in the 1991 NFC Championship Game. During the 1995-96 playoffs, Brown guaranteed a victory over the Philadelphia Eagles. The Eagles opened the game with 51–7 run. The Lions went on to lose the game 37–58.

Brown was also a charismatic and respected leader on the team, who graciously donated a great deal of time, energy and money to many charitable causes throughout the Metro Detroit area.

Life after the NFL 

Since his retirement from the NFL, Brown has spent some time with the NFL Network and ESPNEWS as an analyst and also co-hosts a sports radio show for WXYT-FM in Detroit, Michigan.  He has also served as an analyst on ESPN First Take, and is a co-host of the segment "Law Offices of Brooks and Brown." In 2018 he was named as the color analyst for the Detroit Lions radio broadcasts on WJR, replacing Jim Brandstatter.

During 2012, Brown served as an assistant coach for the Andover Barons football team of Andover High School in Bloomfield Hills, Michigan.

On December 22, 2012, Brown admitted during an interview on the SVP and Russillo show on ESPN Radio that he purposefully failed to block Green Bay Packers defensive end Sean Jones during a 1994 game so teammate and quarterback Scott Mitchell would get injured and be forced to leave the game.  Mitchell's finger was broken on the play and he left the game.  Mitchell was taken aback by Brown's comments, remarking, "I had Lomas in my home. . . .  I'm dumbfounded that he would do such a thing. . . .  [F]or him to allow someone to take a shot at a teammate, that's crazy."

Less than a week after the interview, Brown expressed remorse during an episode of ESPN First Take, saying "It's one play out of the 18,000 that I regret."  He did not deny his original comments: "I'm not going to retract, I'm not going to sit here and make excuses . . .  The one thing I can say is I should have been more tactful at how I said that.  That was wrong on my part.  I should have humbly said that.  It came off boastful, and I shouldn't have said it that way.  I said it, I can't take it back, but I shouldn't have said it the way I said it."
Lomas became a partner in Talegator Distributors, LLC "the greatest tailgating invention ever!" in 2009
and has helped to promote the product and various marketing efforts. Recently the Talegator became a proud partner with the Jimmy V Foundation.

See also 

 1984 College Football All-America Team
 Florida Gators football, 1980–89
 List of Detroit Lions players
 List of Florida Gators football All-Americans
 List of Florida Gators in the NFL Draft
 List of New York Giants players
 List of Phi Beta Sigma brothers
 List of SEC Jacobs Blocking Trophy winners
 List of University of Florida alumni
 List of University of Florida Athletic Hall of Fame members

References

Bibliography 

 Carlson, Norm, University of Florida Football Vault: The History of the Florida Gators, Whitman Publishing, LLC, Atlanta, Georgia (2007).  .
 Golenbock, Peter, Go Gators!  An Oral History of Florida's Pursuit of Gridiron Glory, Legends Publishing, LLC, St. Petersburg, Florida (2002).  .
 Hairston, Jack, Tales from the Gator Swamp: A Collection of the Greatest Gator Stories Ever Told, Sports Publishing, LLC, Champaign, Illinois (2002).  .
 McCarthy, Kevin M.,  Fightin' Gators: A History of University of Florida Football, Arcadia Publishing, Mount Pleasant, South Carolina (2000).  .
 Nash, Noel, ed., The Gainesville Sun Presents The Greatest Moments in Florida Gators Football, Sports Publishing, Inc., Champaign, Illinois (1998).  .

External links 

 

1963 births
Living people
All-American college football players
American football offensive tackles
American sports radio personalities
Arizona Cardinals players
Cleveland Browns players
Detroit Lions announcers
Detroit Lions players
Florida Gators football players
National Conference Pro Bowl players
National Football League announcers
New York Giants players
Players of American football from Miami
Miami Springs Senior High School alumni
Tampa Bay Buccaneers players
Ed Block Courage Award recipients